Golden Nation Network (GNN) is a news, current affairs and lifestyle television channel in the Philippines owned by Global Satellite Technology Services. Currently, GNN is available as a free-to-air satellite channel via SES-9 satellite transponder through GSAT, through its terrestrial free TV stations in key provinces, and also on SkyCable in Mega Manila since November 2022. Its studios, offices and technical facilities are located at the First Global Building, 122 Gamboa corner Adelantado streets, Legazpi Village, Makati, Metro Manila, Philippines and the GSTS Building, First Global Technopark, Lot 1910 Governor's Drive, Barangay Ulong Tubig, Carmona, Cavite, Philippines.

Prior to the rebranding, it was then known as the GKTV 3/PCTV 3 from January 6, 2003 to March 23, 2008, and Global News Network from March 24, 2008 to February 3, 2019, and One Media Network from February 4, 2019 to April 30, 2021.

Format and history
The channel was launched on January 6, 2003, as Global Kabayan Television (GKTV) by Global Destiny Cable (now absorbed by Sky Cable), then airing archived programs from third-party productions, movies and in-house cable TV on-air promos.  In 2007, GKTV was rebranded as PCTV (Philippine Cable Television) and began airing news and public service programming that eventually evolved into Global News Network (GNN) aired on March 24, 2008.

GNN was then available on Channel 8 via Global Destiny Cable and Channel 1 via G Sat. Five UHF free-TV stations have been successfully established in the past six months; for Pampanga (UHF Channel 44), Cagayan de Oro (UHF Channel 45), Zamboanga (UHF Channel 43), Baguio (UHF Channel 48), and Naga (UHF Channel 48). GNN's free TV Stations added in five cities will officially launch in July 2010 in General Santos (UHF Channel 40) (Later on to UHF Channel 46 in 2015), Ilocos Sur (UHF Channel 30), Roxas City, Capiz (UHF Channel 43), Cebu City (Channel 45) and Batangas (Channel 34). In June 2011 GNN's another added in free-to-air of Six terrestrial TV Stations are Puerto Princesa (UHF Channel 43), Legazpi (UHF Channel 29), Virac (UHF Channel 43), Dumaguete (UHF Channel 34) and Butuan (UHF Channel 43). In June 2012 GNN free to air TV Station in Southern Mindanao as UHF Channel 41 Davao (after moving to UNTV Channel 51). In mid-2017 until 2019, GNN - during its first iteration - was available on digital terrestrial TV via UHF channel 44 (subchannel 4) in Metro Manila.

On February 4, 2019, as part of the channel's restructure, GNN was rebranded as One Media Network. During its transition period, it aired promo advertisements from various channels that are available on GSAT. Later on, new programs were gradually introduced and integrated to the network's programming grid. Its local affiliate stations in Naga, Pampanga and Cagayan de Oro remained active of its own programming while retaining the GNN brand until during the second quarter of 2019, when they followed the suit without changes on programming.

On May 1, 2021, to avoid confusion with One Network Media Group owned by PLDT Beneficial Trust Fund's broadcasting division MediaQuest Holdings and Cignal TV, One Media was reverted to GNN under its new name Golden Nation Network. The latter is adapted from the sister company of GSTS which also granted its Congressional broadcast franchise.

Affiliates and stations
These stations, among others, broadcast GNN programming:

 DWVN-DTV 45.04: Metro Manila
 DWFB-DTV 44.01: Baguio
 DWFU-DTV 44.01: Pampanga
 DWFA-DTV 48.01: Naga
 DYRL-DTV 50.01: Bacolod
 DYFA-DTV 45.01: Cebu
 DXFU-DTV 45.01 Cagayan de Oro
 DXOW-DTV 41.01: Davao
 DXFA-DTV 43.01 Zamboanga City

Programming

Current
Fast Morning (Morning Newscast)
Newsforce (Evening Newscast)
Newsforce Weekend (Weekend Newscast)
Review Philippines (Late-Night Newscast)
Opinyon Ngayon
Face the Nation
Philippine Biography
Kabuhayang Pinoy
Wellness 101
Sa Barangay Tayo
GNN Forum
Window to the World
Tsismaxxx
The People's Court
Barangay and Police Patrol
Millenials TV
GNN Newsbreak (Hourly News Update)
The Fourth Estate

Programming previously aired on GNN/One Media
Brand TV
DOSTv: Science for the People
Global Village
Hobby Life
Hotspot
Inside Congress
On the Corporate World
GNN Evening Report
Fast Evening
GNN News Update
Newsforce Update
Oras ng Himala (via syndication)
Republika ni Erik Espina (moved to MYtv Cebu)
Youth Tube
Talk News TV with Herman Laurel
Journeys: Chronicles of Our Asian Century
One Media Network Forum
Usapang Bayan
Oras ng Katotohanan (via syndication)
Congress TV
Senate TV
Gabay sa Kabuhayan
The Business Portal
Tek Tok TV
Politics Today
Business and Living
Social Responsibility
EZ Shop

See also
G Sat

References

External links
Official website

24-hour television news channels in the Philippines
Filipino-language television stations
Television channels and stations established in 2003
2003 establishments in the Philippines